EXCL Communications was a Spanish-language broadcasting company founded in 1989 by Athena and Christopher Marks. It acquired its first radio stations, San Jose, California's KBRG and KLOK from brothers Danny Villanueva and James Villanueva (Radio América, Inc) in 1989. After its purchase of Embarcadero Media in 1997, it owned and operated 18 radio stations (many of which used the Radio Romántica format), making it the third largest Spanish radio group in the United States. EXCL was a division of Latin Communications Group from March 1996 until April 20, 2000, when Latin Communications Group was purchased by Entravision.

References 

Defunct radio broadcasting companies of the United States